Konkuduru is a village in the East Godavari district of Andhra Pradesh, India, located on the banks of Tulyabhaga River, which is a tributary of the Godavari River. The Telugu movie director S. V. Krishna Reddy was born in Konkuduru.

References

Villages in East Godavari district